is an early Neo Geo game released by SNK in 1990. It is a first-person shooter and beat 'em up game with action role-playing elements in which players move through the many floors of an office building shooting terrorists. It is a first-person game where the player character's arms and weapons are visible on screen. In 1991, ADK's Crossed Swords had similar gameplay, but with more role-playing elements and hack & slash combat instead of shooting and fist-fighting.

Gameplay 

Movement in the game is done by mainly strafing and only moving forwards or backwards in corridors. Additional moves include ducking, sidestepping and blocking. The player can only progress after all enemies in sight are cleared. Occasionally, the player can move forward into rooms to save hostages or ambush a boss or other enemies. Saving hostages will grant the player healing items, chances to repair or upgrade his weaponry, or random moments of exposition. Eliminating enemies grants the player experience points used to raise a level, granting more power in attacks.

Much of the close combat system resembles Mike Tyson's Punch-Out!!. The player's attack variety consists of four types. Punching (which can be upgraded with brass knuckles) includes some special moves: Strong punches and stunning right hook punches. Kicking includes knee smashes. The combat knife is sturdier but loses power and gets rusty the more it is used. The pistol has limited ammo and no recharges but can be used to pistol-whip to conserve shots. Finally from certain hostages the player can gain a submachine gun which has a wider range than the pistol. Firearms can also be used to blow up various explosive materials in the background against enemies.

Enemies consist mainly of palette-swapped ski-masked men, ninjas and gunmen who get stronger as the player progresses through the levels. There are occasional sub-bosses including engineers, scientists and strongmen. To finish the game, both bosses in the first mission must be eliminated and all six in the second mission.

Plot 
The plot revolves around a CIA agent, named Roy Heart, who needs to traverse office buildings, and warehouses to stop a group of terrorists, known as the Zolge King terrorist group, led by a man named King (who bears a slight resemblance to Geese Howard in his business suit from the Fatal Fury and The King of Fighters franchises, both also by SNK). The group is responsible for the horrible murders of thousands caused by destroying the subways with bombs. As Mr. Heart, the player hunts through the terrorists' bomb factory for those responsible.

Development and release

Reception 

In Japan, Game Machine listed The Super Spy on their December 15, 1990 issue as being the fifth most-successful table arcade unit of the month, outperforming titles such as Columns and its sequel. In North America, RePlay reported The Super Spy to be the seventh most-popular arcade game in January 1991.

The game has been received with an overall mixed reception from critics since its initial release.

Notes

References

External links 
 The Super Spy at GameFAQs
 The Super Spy at Giant Bomb
 The Super Spy at Killer List of Videogames
 The Super Spy at MobyGames

1990 video games
ACA Neo Geo games
Action role-playing video games
Arcade video games
D4 Enterprise games
First-person shooters
First-person video games
Multiplayer and single-player video games
Neo Geo games
Neo Geo CD games
Nintendo Switch games
PlayStation Network games
PlayStation 4 games
SNK beat 'em ups
Terrorism in fiction
Video games scored by Masahiko Hataya
Virtual Console games
Windows games
Xbox One games
Video games developed in Japan
Hamster Corporation games